Bangladesh International Tutorial, abbreviated as BIT, is a private English-medium education school in Dhaka, Bangladesh. Established in 1983, it is run in accordance with the London Board for the Ordinary (O-level) and Advanced Level (A-level) examinations. Bangladesh International Tutorial organised a graduation ceremony for the GCE ordinary and advanced level classes at the Red Brick School at Uttara in the city.

Curriculum 
In 2010, 47 BIT students won bronze or silver Duke of Edinburgh's Awards. Two BIT students placed among the top 63 achievers worldwide on the O- and A-level examinations in 2012.

Activities 
Facilities at BIT include debating, dramatics, poetry and dancing. Science fairs and poetry competitions are held. Competitions are organised throughout the academic year.

See also
 List of schools in Bangladesh

References

External links
 Official website of BIT

Educational institutions of Uttara
Schools in Dhaka District
Education in Dhaka
Educational institutions established in 1983
1983 establishments in Bangladesh